Patrick Moreau (born 3 November 1973) is a French former professional footballer who played as a defender.

References

1973 births
Living people
People from Cognac, France
Sportspeople from Charente
Association football defenders
French footballers
Footballers at the 1996 Summer Olympics
Olympic footballers of France
France under-21 international footballers
Racing Club de France Football players
Ligue 1 players
AS Saint-Étienne players
SC Bastia players
FC Metz players
AS Nancy Lorraine players
LB Châteauroux players
Ligue 2 players
Footballers from Nouvelle-Aquitaine